Mesostruma is a genus of ants in the subfamily Myrmicinae. It is restricted to Australia.

Species
Mesostruma bella Shattuck, 2000
Mesostruma browni Taylor, 1962
Mesostruma eccentrica Taylor, 1973
Mesostruma exolympica Taylor, 1973
Mesostruma inornata Shattuck, 2000
Mesostruma laevigata Brown, 1952
Mesostruma loweryi Taylor, 1973
Mesostruma spinosa Shattuck, 2007
Mesostruma turneri (Forel, 1895)

References

External links

Myrmicinae
Ant genera
Hymenoptera of Australia